The 2019 Stoke-on-Trent City Council election took place on 2 May 2019 to elect members of Stoke-on-Trent City Council in England. This was on the same day as other local elections.

Election result

|-

Ward results

Abbey Hulton and Townsend

Baddeley, Milton and Norton

Bentilee and Ubberley

Birches Head and Central Forest Park

Blurton East

Blurton West and Newstead

Boothen and Oakhill

Bradeley and Chell Heath

Broadway and Longton East

Burslem Central

Burslem Park

Dresden and Florence

Eaton Park

Etruria and Hanley

Fenton East

Fenton West and Mount Pleasant

Ford Green and Smallthorne

Goldenhill and Sandyford

Great Chell and Packmoor

Hanford and Trentham

Hanley Park and Shelton

Hartshill and Basford

Hollybush and Longton West

Joiners Square

Lightwood North and Normacot

Little Chell and Stanfield

Meir Hay

Meir North

Meir Park

Meir South

Moorcroft

Penkhull and Stoke

Sandford Hill

Sneyd Green

Springfields and Trent Vale

Tunstall

Weston Coyney

By-elections 
There have been three by-elections since the last set of elections in May 2019.

Moorcroft 
The first was the Moorcroft by-election, which was held to replace former Labour group leader Mr. Mohammed Pervez on 6th May 2021.

Penkhull and Stoke
The second was the Penkhull and Stoke by-election, which was held to replace the former City Independent Councillor Mr Randi Conteh, on 1st July 2021.

Bentilee and Ubberley
The third was the Bentilee and Ubberley by-election, which was held to replace the former Labour Councillor Mr Stephen Funnell, on 22nd September 2022.

References 

Stoke
Stoke-on-Trent City Council elections
2010s in Staffordshire